Xiang Chong may refer to:

Xiang Chong (Water Margin) (項充), a fictional character in the Water Margin
Xiang Chong (Three Kingdoms) (向寵), Shu Han general of the Three Kingdoms period